Saint Narnus is venerated as the first bishop of Bergamo. Christian tradition holds that he was consecrated during the Apostolic Age in his office by St. Barnabas, although Narnus probably lived later than that.  The oldest source that mentions Narnus dates from the 13th century; it was written by Branca da Gandino, a friar.  He considers Narnus a bishop of Bergamo during the reign of Diocletian in the fourth century.

Veneration
He was buried in the crypt of a church in Bergamo dedicated to Saint Alexander of Bergamo. When this church was demolished in 1561, Narnus’ relics, as well as those of his successor St. Viator, were translated to the church of San Vincenzo, today the cathedral of Bergamo, where they still rest today.

References

External links
Saint Narnus
 Santi e Beati

4th-century Christian saints
Italian saints
Bishops of Bergamo
345 deaths
Year of birth unknown